Deathsentences of the Polished and Structurally Weak is an album and booklet by Negativland. The band describes the project as "a 6 by 12 inch 64-page full-color book which comes with a 45-minute CD soundtrack."

CD and Track listing
"The CD is a meticulously-layered, ever-shifting electro-acoustic soundscape created to accompany the book. No bass lines, no melody, no dialogue, no singing, no beat - the sound of Negativland's recording studio being destroyed in a car crash."

All tracks by Negativland:

 "Only You Can Rock Me" – 2:37
 "Pack It Up" – 3:05
 "Arbory Hill" – 3:26
 "Ain't No Baby" – 5:29
 "Lookin' Out For #1" – 2:51
 "Hot & Ready" – 1:39
 "Cherry" – 5:40
 "Don't Fool Me" – 5:48
 "#1 Rep" – 2:59
 "One More For The Rodeo" – 4:44
 "Born To Loose" – 2:08
 "When They Ring The Golden Bells" – 4:10

Booklet
The accompanying booklet is a 6 by 12 inch 64-page full-color book packaged inside of a large die-cut automotive courtesy envelope. The band's website describes the book as "a poignant, voyeuristic, disturbing, and occasionally funny glimpse into lives which may be very different from your own...or eerily similar."

Compiled by band member Richard Lyons, the book comprises photos of smashed-up cars in a junkyard; next to each crumpled car is reprinted the text of a note or letter or list found in the car.

In 1997, long before the book was released, Richard Lyons described the project and read excerpts from selections of the found text for an episode of the Public Radio program This American Life.

Personnel
Mark Hosler - tapes, electronics, rhythms, Booper, clarinet, organ, viola, loops, guitar, etc.
Richard Lyons - tapes, electronics, rhythms, Booper, clarinet, organ, viola, loops, guitar, etc.
David Wills - synthesizer, voice, tape
Peter Dayton - guitars, viola
W. M. Kennedy - guitar
Jonathan Land - processed guitars, electronics

References

External links
This American Life - Episode 70: Other People's Mail (1997) - includes segment of Richard Lyons describing the booklet project, with excerpts from the text.

Negativland albums
2002 soundtrack albums
Book soundtracks
2002 books